Cleptonotus subarmatus is a species of beetle in the family Cerambycidae. It was described by Léon Fairmaire and Germain 1859. It is known from Chile.

References

Parmenini
Beetles described in 1859
Endemic fauna of Chile